Flexopteron is a genus of sea snails, marine gastropod mollusks in the subfamily Muricinae of the family Muricidae, the murex snails or rock snails.

Species
Species within the genus Flexopteron include:
 Flexopteron akainakares Houart & Héros, 2015
 Flexopteron oliverai (Kosuge, 1984)
 † Flexopteron philippinensis Shuto, 1969 
 Flexopteron poppei (Houart, 1993)
 Flexopteron primanova (Houart, 1985)

References

 Shuto, T. 1969. Neogene gastropods from Panay Island, the Philippines. Contributions to the geology and paleontology of Southeast Asia, LXVII. Memoirs of the Faculty of Science, Kyushu University, series D, Geology 19(1):1-250, 43 figs., 24 pls. page(s): 111
 Houart R. (2014). Living Muricidae of the world. Muricinae. Murex, Promurex, Haustellum, Bolinus, Vokesimurex and Siratus. Harxheim: ConchBooks. 197 pp.

External links
 Houart R. & Héros V. (2015). New species of Muricidae Rafinesque, 1815 (Mollusca: Gastropoda) from the Western Indian Ocean. Zoosystema. 37(3): 481-503
 Barco, A.; Marshall, B.; Houart, R.; Oliverio, M. (2015). Molecular phylogenetics of Haustrinae and Pagodulinae (Neogastropoda: Muricidae) with a focus on New Zealand species. Journal of Molluscan Studies. 81(4): 476-488

Muricinae